Denis Wosik (born 23 November 1996) is a German-Polish kickboxer. He is the current Wu Lin Feng -63 kg World Champion.

As of November 2021 Combat Press ranked him as the #6 super bantamweight kickboxer in the world.

Kickboxing career

Wu Lin Feng
Wosik made his professional debut in May 2014, against Omid Rezaid at Storm Fighting Championship. He won his debut by decision. After losing his next fight to Kevin Burmester, he went on a three fight winning streak, which earned him the chance to fight Johann Dederer for the Wu Lin Feng German -66 kg title. The fight went into an extra round, after which Dederer won a decision.

In March 2016, Wosik fought and beat Mohamed Lazrak for the International WFMC K-1 rules title.

Wosik lost his next fight against Marcin Kret at HFO 2: Kunlun Eliminations by unanimous decision.

Dennis Wosik entered the 2019 Wu Lin Feng 63 kg World tournament. He defeated Zhu Shuai by decision in the quarterfinals, Jin Ying by decision in the semifinals, and won the tournament with a decision win against Fang Feida in the finals. He defended his title for the first time in January 2020, when he won the rematch with Fang Feida by decision.

Glory
Wosik made his Glory promotional debut against the RISE lightweight champion Naoki Seki at Glory 81: Ben Saddik vs. Adegbuyi 2 on August 20, 2022. He won the fight by unanimous decision, with all five judges scoring the bout 30–26 in his favor.

Wosik was expected to face Hicham Chaaboute at Glory 82 on November 19, 2022. Chaaboute later withdrew for undisclosed reasons and was replaced by Mohamed El Mesbahi. He won the fight by unanimous decision.

Wosik faced promotional newcomer Marcos Rios at Glory Rivals 5 on January 28, 2023. He lost the fight by split decision.

Titles and achievements
World Sport Fight Martial Arts Council
 2016 WFMC International -72.5 kg Champion
Wu Lin Feng
 2019 Wu Lin Feng World -63 kg Champion (Defended once)

Kickboxing record 

|-
|- style="background:#fbb;"
| 2023-01-28 || Loss||align=left| Marcos Rios || Glory Rivals 5 || Tulum, Mexico || Decision (Split) || 3 ||3:00 
|-
|- style="background:#cfc;"
| 2022-11-19 || Win ||align=left| Mohamed El Mesbahi  || Glory 82 || Bonn, Germany || Decision (Unanimous)  ||  3||3:00 
|-
|- style="background:#cfc;"
| 2022-08-20 || Win ||align=left| Naoki || Glory 81: Ben Saddik vs. Adegbuyi 2 || Düsseldorf, Germany || Decision (Unanimous) ||3  || 3:00
|-  style="background:#cfc;"
| 2020-01-11||Win ||align=left| Fang Feida || Wu Lin Feng 2020: WLF World Cup 2019-2020 Final || Zhuhai, China || Decision (Unanimous) ||5 ||3:00 
|-
! style=background:white colspan=9 |
|-  style="background:#cfc;"
| 2019-09-28|| Win ||align=left| Jiao Daobo || Wu Lin Feng 2019: WLF -67kg World Cup 2019-2020 4th Group Stage || Zhengzhou, China || Decision || 3|| 3:00
|-  style="background:#cfc;"
| 2019-04-27||Win ||align=left| Fang Feida || Wu Lin Feng 2019: WLF -63kg Championship World Tournament, Final || Zhuhai, China || Decision  ||3 ||3:00 
|-
! style=background:white colspan=9 |
|-  style="background:#cfc;"
| 2019-04-27||Win ||align=left| Jin Ying || Wu Lin Feng 2019: WLF -63kg Championship World Tournament, Semi Finals || Zhuhai, China || Decision  ||3 ||3:00
|- style="background:#cfc;"
| 2019-04-27|| Win||align=left| Zhu Shuai || Wu Lin Feng 2019: WLF -63kg Championship World Tournament, Quarter Finals  || Zhuhai, China || Decision  || 3 || 3:00
|-  style="background:#fbb;"
| 2019-01-02 || Loss || align=left| Diego Freitas || Wu Lin Feng 2019: WLF -65kg World Championship Tournament Semi Finals|| Hengqin, China || Decision || 3 || 3:00
|-  style="background:#cfc;"
| 2019-01-02 || Win || align=left| Meng Guodong || Wu Lin Feng 2019: WLF -65kg World Championship Tournament Quarter Finals|| Hengqin, China || Ext.R Decision || 4 || 3:00
|-  style="background:#fbb;"
| 2018-10-13 ||Loss||align=left|  Eddy Nait Slimani || World GBC Tour 13 ||  Mazan, France || Decision (Unanimous) || 3 || 3:00
|-  style="background:#cfc;"
| 2018-09-29 || Win||align=left|  Wang Wenfeng || David Zunwu World Fighting Championship ||  Macau || Decision (Unanimous) || 3 || 3:00
|-  style="background:#cfc;"
| 2018-06-02|| Win ||align=left| Wang Zhiwei  || Wu Lin Feng 2018: Yi Long VS Saiyok || Chongqing, China ||Decision|| 3 || 3:00
|-  bgcolor="#fbb"
| 2018-03-21 || Loss || align=left| Masanobu Goshu || K-1 World GP 2018: K'FESTA.1 -60 kg World Tournament, Quarter Finals || Saitama, Japan || Decision (Majority) || 3 || 3:00
|- style="background:#cfc;"
| 2018-03-03|| Win||align=left| Jin Ying || Wu Lin Feng 2018: World Championship Tianjin  || Tianjin, China || Decision  || 3 || 3:00
|- style="background:#cfc;"
| 2017-12-04|| Win||align=left| Zhao Chuanlin || Wu Lin Feng 2017: Yi Long VS Sitthichai   || Kunming, China || Decision  || 3 || 3:00
|- style="background:#fbb;"
| 2017-09-16|| Loss||align=left| Khalid el Moukadam ||Enfusion Talents #36 ||  Zwolle, Netherlands || Decision || 3 ||3:00
|-  style="background:#cfc;"
| 2017-07-15|| Win ||align=left| Said Magomedov|| ACB KB 10: Russia vs. China || Moscow, Russia || KO (Body Kick)|| 3 || 1:19
|- style="background:#cfc;"
| 2017-06-03|| Win||align=left|  Haris Biber ||Platinum Cup || Wuppertal, Germany || Decision (Unanimous) || 3 || 3:00
|- Style="background:#cfc;"
| 2017-04-23|| Win||align=left| Kojo Ennin || Fight Vision Europe 1  || Herne, Germany || KO || 1 || 1:45
|- Style="background:#cfc;"
|- Style="background:#cfc;"
|- style="background:#cfc;"
| 2017-04-01|| Win||align=left| Li Yankun ||Wu Lin Feng 2017: China VS Europe  || Zhengzhou, China || Decision (Unanimous)  || 3 || 3:00
|- style="background:#cfc;"
| 2016-|| Win||align=left| Hao Shengbin || Wu Lin Feng   || Zhengzhou, China || Decision (Unanimous)  || 3 || 3:00
|- style="background:#c5d2ea;"
| 2016-10-01|| Draw||align=left| Cristian Dorel ||KOK World Series in Chicinau Vol. 18 ||  Chisinau, Moldova || Ext.R Decision || 4 || 3:00
|- style="background:#fbb;"
| 2016-06-17|| Loss||align=left| Xie Lei ||Wu Lin Feng: China vs Germany ||  Zhengzhou, China ||  Decision (Split) || 3 ||3:00
|- style="background:#fbb;"
| 2016-05-01|| Loss||align=left| Marcin Kret ||HFO 2: Kunlun Eliminations ||  Poland ||  Decision (Unanimous) || 3 ||3:00
|- style="background:#cfc;"
| 2016-03-12|| Win||align=left| Mohamed Lazrak || Erste Wiesbadener Fight Night ||  Wiesbaden, Germany || Decision  || 5 || 3:00
|-
! style=background:white colspan=9 |
|- style="background:#cfc;"
|- style="background:#cfc;"
|- style="background:#fbb;"
| 2015-04-18|| Loss||align=left| Johann Dederer ||Day of Destruction 10 ||  Hamburg, Germany || Ext.R Decision || 4 ||3:00
|-
! style=background:white colspan=9 |
|-  bgcolor="CCFFCC"
| 2015-03-21 || Win ||align=left| Rafik Habiat || Night of the Champions 3 || Flörsheim am Main, Germany || Decision (Split) || 3 || 3:00
|- style="background:#cfc;"
| 2014-12-20|| Win||align=left| Stanislav Renita ||KOK Eagle Series 2014 in Chicinau ||  Chisinau, Moldova || KO (Low Kick) || 1 ||1:30
|- style="background:#cfc;"
| 2014-10-25|| Win||align=left| Rhydel Vogelenzang ||Storm FC V ||  Germany || Decision || 3 ||3:00
|- style="background:#fbb;"
| 2014-09-16|| Loss||align=left| Kevin Burmester ||Enfusion Talents #03 ||  Merseburg, Germany || Decision || 3 ||3:00
|- style="background:#cfc;"
| 2014-05-31|| Win||align=left| Omid Rezaid ||Storm Fighting Championship||  Germany || Decision || 3 ||3:00
|-
| colspan=9 | Legend:

See also 
List of male kickboxers
List of Germans of Polish origin

References

External links
Glory profile

1996 births
Living people
German male kickboxers
Bantamweight kickboxers
Sportspeople from Duisburg
German people of Polish descent
21st-century German people